RCSI Graduate School of Healthcare Mnagament (GSM) is a non-profit school of healthcare management and medical education based in Dublin, Ireland. It has international campuses in Bahrain and Dubai Healthcare City, UAE. Established in 2005 by the Royal College of Surgeons in Ireland (RCSI), it is Ireland's only third level institution dedicated exclusively to offering Leadership and Management Programmes for health professionals.

History
The Institute of Leadership was established to align these programmes and to create a centre of excellence for the personal and professional development of health professionals. The Institute's programmes are designed using a blended learning approach that provides the flexibility for working health professionals to continue their professional development.

International campuses
The Institute has bases in Dublin, Dubai and Bahrain. Postgraduate programmes are offered in Ireland, the UAE, and Bahrain. In addition, the Institute is active in providing training and development in Abu Dhabi, Egypt, Qatar, Saudi Arabia and sub-Saharan Africa.

Academic programmes
Graduate School of Healthcare Management programmes are accredited by Ireland's largest and oldest University, the National University of Ireland. In the UAE, programmes are also accredited by the Commission for Academic Accreditation of the Ministry of Higher Education and Scientific Research (UAE) and are recognised by the Higher Education Council (HEC) in Bahrain.

As of May 2016, the Institute offers accredited postgraduate courses in:

Masters level
MSc in Healthcare Management
MSc in Leadership
MSc in Quality & Safety in Healthcare Management
MSc in Leadership in Health Professions Education

Other programmes
Professional Development Programmes

Collaboration
The MSc in Leadership in Health professions Education is run jointly with University of Sharjah, UAE. The MSc in Organisational Change & Leadership Development was run in conjunction with Beaumont Hospital and Dublin City University 2010-2014. The Institute also accredits an MSc in Bereavement Studies and a Professional Certificate in Children and Loss which is run in conjunction with the Irish Hospice Foundation.

Research
Research areas include:
Change and Innovation
Healthcare Management
Informatics
Medical education
Patient Safety & Quality

References

National University of Ireland
2005 establishments in Ireland
Universities and colleges in the Republic of Ireland
Educational institutions established in 2005
Medical associations based in Ireland
Medical education in the Republic of Ireland